The Utica Pioneers are composed of 27 teams representing Utica University in intercollegiate athletics, including men and women's basketball, cross country, golf, ice hockey, lacrosse, soccer, swimming & diving, tennis, track and field, and wrestling. Men's sports include baseball and football. Women's sports include field hockey, gymnastics, softball, volleyball, and water polo. The Pioneers compete in the NCAA Division III and are members of the Empire 8 for all sports except men's and women's ice hockey, and women's water polo. The men's and women's ice hockey teams compete as members of the United Collegiate Hockey Conference, and the women's water polo team competes as a member of the Collegiate Water Polo Association

Teams

History
Utica University offers 29 NCAA Division III intercollegiate sports.  Teams are known as the Pioneers and compete in the Empire 8 along with Elmira College, Alfred University, Hartwick College, Nazareth College, Stevens Institute of Technology, and Saint John Fisher College.  The men's and women's hockey teams compete in the United Collegiate Hockey Conference athletic conference. The women's water polo team competes in the Collegiate Water Polo Association's Northern Division.

The student body's overall interest in athletics was significantly bolstered by the addition of football and ice hockey teams in 2001, and the addition of men's/women's wrestling and women's gymnastics beginning in 2023-24.

The football, field hockey, soccer and lacrosse teams play in Charles A. Gaetano Stadium. The ice hockey teams compete at the Adirondack Bank Center.  The Aud, as it is commonly called, was built in 1959 and provides seating for 3,850 fans.  The men's hockey team led the nation in Division III home attendance in the 2006–07 and 2007–08 seasons.  The basketball teams play on campus at the Harold Thomas Clark Jr. Athletic Center, which also has a pool and racquetball courts.

In November 2007, the Utica University football team set an NCAA football record, the highest combined score (142 points) by two teams, in their 72–70 loss to Hartwick in four overtimes.  In this game, Utica also set the NCAA record for most points scored (70) by the losing team.

Utica University has a women's basketball team which won the Empire 8 championship in 2008. In 2009, they tied with Ithaca as the regular season Empire 8 champions. In 2010, they regained their Empire 8 championship title.

References

External links
 

Utica University